William I (1020 – 12 November 1087), called the Great (le Grand or Tête Hardie, "the Stubborn"), was Count of Burgundy from 1057 to 1087 and Mâcon from 1078 to 1087. He was a son of Renaud I and Alice of Normandy, daughter of Richard II, Duke of Normandy. William was the father of several notable children, including Pope Callixtus II. 

In 1057, he succeeded his father and reigned over a territory larger than that of the Franche-Comté itself. In 1087, he died in Besançon, Prince-Archbishopric of Besançon, Holy Roman Empire—an independent city within the County of Burgundy. He was buried in Besançon's Cathedral of St John.

William married a woman named  (a.k.a. Etiennette). 

Children of Stephanie (order uncertain):
 Renaud II, William's successor; died on First Crusade
 Stephen I, successor to Renaud II; died on the Crusade of 1101
 Raymond of Burgundy, who married Urraca of León and Castile and thus was given the government of Galicia (Spain)
Sybilla (or Maud), married (in 1080) Eudes I of Burgundy
 Gisela of Burgundy, married (1090) Humbert II of Savoy and then Renier I of Montferrat
 Clementia married Robert II, Count of Flanders and was regent during his absence. She married, secondly, Godfrey I, Count of Leuven
 Guy of Vienne, elected pope, in 1119 at the Abbey of Cluny, as Callixtus II
 William
 Eudes
 , Archbishop of Besançon
 Stephanie married Lambert, lord of Peyrins (brother of Adhemar of Le Puy)
 Ermentrude, married (in 1065) Theodoric I, Count of Montbéliard

References

Sources

 Portail sur Histoire Bourgogne et Histoire Franche-Comté, Gilles Maillet.

1020 births
1087 deaths
Anscarids
Counts of Burgundy
Counts of Mâcon
Burials at Besançon Cathedral